The Type 072 (NATO reporting name: Yukan) is a class of tank landing ship in the People's Republic of China's People's Liberation Army Navy (PLAN). Seven were built and began entering service by the early-1980s. They replaced American-built LSTs from the Second World War.

Production may have occurred at the Wuhan Shipyard, with the first completed in 1980, or at the Zhonghua Shipyard, with ships entering service from 1978 to 1995.

The bow ramp handles a 50 ton load, and the rear ramp a 20 ton load. It carries two American LCVPs.

Supply ship
A class of supply or ammunition ship (NATO reporting name: Yantai) was developed from the Type 072. Changes include a shorter forecastle, a blunter bow without a door, and the addition of cranes fore and aft of the superstructure.

Three were built by Zhonghua and entered PLAN service in 1992.

Ships of the class

References

Sources

Amphibious warfare vessel classes
Amphibious warfare vessels of the People's Liberation Army Navy